Parabrimidius ovalis is a species of beetle in the family Cerambycidae, and the only species in the genus Parabrimidius. It was described by Stephan von Breuning in 1938.

References

Phrissomini
Beetles described in 1938